The Pettaquamscutt River (also known as Narrow River) is a tidal extension of the Mattatuxet River in the U.S. state of Rhode Island. There are no dams along the river's length.

Course
The river begins in name below Carr Pond Dam (on the Mattatuxet River) in North Kingstown. This dam is also the boundary between fresh and salt water. From here, the river flows south and becomes the boundary between South Kingstown and Narragansett. The river continues to Pettaquamscutt Cove then out to Narragansett Bay. The Pettaquamscutt River is also commonly known as the Narrow River, both because of a long narrow stretch from Lacy bridge to the Mettatuxett Yacht Club as well as the narrow, hazardous mouth of the river where it empties into Narragansett Bay.  The river is composed of at least five distinct sections, running from north to south: the upper pond, the lake, the narrows, the flats, and the mouth.

Crossings
Below is a list of all crossings over the Pettaquamscutt River. The list starts at the headwaters and goes downstream.
North Kingstown
Gilbert Stuart Road
South Kingstown
Bridgetown Road
Middlebridge Road
Narragansett
Boston Neck Road (RI 1A)
The river is spanned by three bridges:  Lacy Bridge, Middle Bridge, and Sprague Bridge.

Tributaries
The Pettaquamscutt River has no named tributaries, though it has many unnamed tributaries that also feed it.

See also
List of rivers in Rhode Island
Mattatuxet River
Narragansett Bay

References

Maps from the United States Geological Survey

External links
Narrow River Preservation Association

Rivers of Washington County, Rhode Island
North Kingstown, Rhode Island
South Kingstown, Rhode Island
Narragansett, Rhode Island
Rivers of Rhode Island